Hugues Randolph Gall (born 18 March 1940) is a French opera manager, former head of the Grand Théâtre de Genève and the Paris Opera.

Career 
Born in Honfleur, after his studies at the Institut d'études politiques de Paris and at the Sorbonne in German literature, Gall began his career in the offices of Edgar Faure at the Ministry of Agriculture and then at the Ministry of National Education; in the latter position, he was responsible for artistic education. He then created the music program of the baccalaureate and the artistic department of the University of Vincennes. He then joined the cabinet of Edmond Michelet, Minister of State in charge of Cultural Affairs.

He was then director of the Grand Théâtre de Genève from 1980 to 1995, and finally director of the Paris Opera from 1995 to 2004.

On 18 December 2002, Gall was elected a member of the Académie des Beaux-Arts in the chair previously occupied by Daniel Wildenstein. From 2005 to 2009, he was an extraordinary State Councillor; Vice-President of the Nureyev Foundation until 2009, member of the Board of the Veolia Environnement Corporate Foundation until 2011 and still a member of the Chambre Professionnelle des Directions d'Opéra(CPDO). From 2002 to 2008, he chaired the jury of the International singing competition of Toulouse. In March 2008, he was elected by his colleagues at the Académie des Beaux-Arts as director of the Fondation Monet in Giverny and was re-elected to this position for a period of 5 years in March 2013.

At the end of March 2008, Gall was appointed chairman of the committee responsible for filling the position of director of the Villa Médicis in Rome. This commission (known as the "Gall Commission") was thus responsible for establishing the criteria for the admissibility of applications according to the needs of Villa Médicis, then interviewing the candidates corresponding to these criteria and proposing a list of personalities deemed suitable for the position. 

The "Gall Commission" was composed of Paul Andreu, architect, Edmonde Charles-Roux, writer, Patrice Chéreau, director, Pascal Dusapin, composer, Marc Fumaroli, historian, Jean Guéguinou, Ambassador of France, Brigitte Lefèvre, Director of Dance at the Paris Opera Ballet, and of Muriel Mayette, General Administrator of the Comédie-Française. In May 2008, of the three candidates selected and presented at the choice of the President of the Republic, it was Frédéric Mitterrand who was appointed Director of the Académie de France à Rome, which therefore marked the end of the "Gall Commission".

Since 2008, Gall has been a member of the Council of the Ordre national de la Légion d'honneur and is President of the Orchestre français des jeunes (FOJ), an institution created in 1982, funded by the Ministry of Culture and in residence at the Grand Théâtre de Provence in Aix en Provence.

On 28 October 2010, he was appointed for a 5-year term as a qualified person chosen for their expertise in environmental and sustainable development issues at the French Economic, Social and Environmental Council (CESE). He is a member of the Commission des Affaires Étrangères et Européennes of the French parliament.

On 17 February 2010, Valéry Giscard d'Estaing announced Gall's participation in the commission for reflection on the future of the Hôtel de la Marine chaired by the former President of the Republic. This commission brought together twelve personalities, members of the Institut de France, historians, former ministers and heads of cultural institutions. His report was submitted to the President of the Republic in July 2010, thus signing the dissolution of this temporary committee.

He is also a member of the cultural council of the Monnaie de Paris and the strategic reflection council of the Réunion des musées nationaux.

Awards 
 Bourgeois d’honneur de Genève
 Grande Médaille d'Honneur de la ville de Honfleur (1997)
 Laureate of the Prix Grand Siècle Laurent-Perrier (1999)
 Laureate of the Beaumarchais medal of the SACD (2004)
 Commandeur of the Légion d'honneur
 Commandeur of the Ordre national du Mérite
 Commandeur of the Ordre des Arts et des Lettres
 Commandeur of the Palmes académiques
 Chevalier of the Mérite agricole
 Commandeur of the Order of Merit of the Federal Republic of Germany
 Order of Friendship (Russia) in 2011

References

External links 
 Hugues Gall on the site of the Académie des Beaux-Arts
 Interview of Hugues Gall, former director of the Paris Opera on La Tribune de l'art
 Hugues Gall on Valeurs actuelles
 Hugues Gall, de l’Académie des beaux-arts, et l’opéra
 Palais Garnier : Hugues Gall monte à l'assaut on ForumOpera.com

1940 births
Living people
People from Honfleur
Sciences Po alumni
Opera managers
Directors of the Paris Opera
Members of the Académie des beaux-arts
Commanders Crosses of the Order of Merit of the Federal Republic of Germany
Commandeurs of the Légion d'honneur
Commanders of the Ordre national du Mérite
Commandeurs of the Ordre des Arts et des Lettres
Commandeurs of the Ordre des Palmes Académiques
Knights of the Order of Agricultural Merit